Os Grãos is the sixth studio album by Brazilian rock band Os Paralamas do Sucesso. It was released in September 1991.

Track listing

Personnel
Os Paralamas do Sucesso
 Bi Ribeiro — bass
 João Barone — drums, percussion, programming
 Herbert Vianna — guitar, keyboards, vocals; cover concept, production (as Teabag V)

References 

1991 albums
Os Paralamas do Sucesso albums
EMI Records albums